Mayako (written: 摩耶子 or 真耶子) is a feminine Japanese given name. Notable people with the name include:

, Japanese pianist and composer
, Japanese voice actress

Japanese feminine given names